20 Years of Jethro Tull: Highlights is a 27-track (21 on CD) distillation of the Jethro Tull box set 20 Years of Jethro Tull.

Track listing

See also
 20 Years of Jethro Tull (1988 boxed set)
 20 Years of Jethro Tull (1988 video)

External links

References

Jethro Tull (band) compilation albums
Sampler albums
1988 compilation albums
Chrysalis Records compilation albums